Bolotnikovo may refer to:

 Bolotnikovo, Republic of Mordovia, a village (selo) in the Republic of Mordovia, Russia
 Bolotnikovo, name of several other rural localities in Russia

See also
 Bolotnik